Herbert Kohl could refer to: 

Herb Kohl (born 1935), American politician from Wisconsin
Herbert R. Kohl (born 1937), American educator

See also
Herbert Cole (1867–1930), English book illustrator and portrait artist
Herbert Kohler Jr. (1939–2022), American plumbing manufacturing executive